Mark James Keough (born September 30, 1953) is a businessman and a Christian pastor, radio host, and educator from The Woodlands, Texas, who has been serving as the Montgomery County County Judge since January 2019. He previously served as a Republican member of the Texas House of Representatives for District 15 in suburban Montgomery County north of Houston. On May 31, 2017, Keough announced that he would not be running for re-election in 2018 to the Texas House but would instead contest the office of County Judge. On November 6, 2018, Keough defeated Democrat Jay Stittleburg by a three-to-one margin.

Background

Keough received a bachelor's degree from Cedarville University, a private institution in Cedarville, Ohio. He obtained master's degrees from Dallas Theological Seminary and Grace Theological Seminary in Winona Lake, Indiana. He also attended the University of Cincinnati in Cincinnati, Ohio. For more than two decades, Keough was engaged in automobile sales, including fourteen years as the general sales manager of Northside Lexus in north Harris County. He left the automobile business to establish Mark Keough Ministries, which includes the Pathfinders Fellowship of The Woodlands. In addition to his continuing work as a pastor of The Woodlands Bible Church and radio host, he has been the headmaster of a private Christian school.

Political life

Texas House district 15
On March 4, 2014, Keough won the Republican nomination to replace one-term Representative Steve Toth. Keough polled 57% of the vote against his intraparty opponent, Bruce Tough, who was the chairman of The Woodlands township board of directors, who received 43%. Keough was then unopposed in the heavily Republican district in the November 4, 2014, general election.

Keough is a vocal opponent of separation of church and state, a concept that he does not find in the First Amendment to the United States Constitution.

In 2015, Keough introduced legislation to establish statewide victim-offender mediation for punishments with the goal of reducing recidivism in prisons. A member of the National Rifle Association, Keough opposed gun-free zones in schools and churches. He would allow licensed gun owners to carry weapons in such zones. Keough worked to repeal of margins taxes on small businesses. He worked to upgrade the penalties for the possession of child pornography from a third-degree to a second-degree felony. He proposed the abolition of  sanctuary cities, those in which municipalities forbid the use of any local funds to enforce national immigration laws.

Keough was unopposed in both the 2016 Republican primary and the 2016 general election, winning another two year term to the Texas legislature.

Montgomery County Judge
Keough announced on May 31, 2017, he would not seek re-election to the Texas House but instead run against incumbent Montgomery County Judge Craig Doyal.  Doyal and others in Montgomery County were indicted on June 24, 2016, on the charge of conspiring to circumvent the Texas Open Meetings Act.  Doyal has also been accused of misusing county funds to support his re-election and recording campaign videos in county offices in violation of state law.  Doyal also has multiple accusations of nepotism, conflicts of interest, and mismanagement pending against him. On March 6, 2018, Keough defeated Doyal in the Republican primary, 57% to 42%. Keough defeated Democrat Jay Stittleburg in the general election held on November 6, 2018, 75% to 25%.

Keough was sworn in as County Judge on January 2, 2019 and in the first court meeting after he took office he reduced his own salary by 12% as he promised to do during his election campaign.

Personal life
Keough and his wife, the former Kimberly "Kim" Sparks, have four children.

Keough was charged with a DWI on September 10, 2020. He was driving with zolpidem (also known as Ambien) and amphetamine in his blood. Ambien is a sleep aid. Keough hit a private individual's car and then hit a police vehicle. Passengers in both vehicles that he hit were injured. The passenger injured stated that he had to receive special treatment for spinal injuries. The deputy constable's spine was injured permanently and he had to resign from service. Both cars Keough hit were totaled. Keough's driver's license was ordered suspended for 90 days, he was required to pay a $2,000 fine, and court fees. Montgomery County taxpayers pay $80,000 for a deputy constable's salary to drive Keough around since Keough's car accident.

Note

Election results
2018 general election for Montgomery County, Texas County Judge

2018 Republican primary election for Montgomery County, Texas County Judge

2014 general election for Texas 15th district state representative

References

External links
 Campaign website
 State legislative page
 Mark Keough at the Texas Tribune

|-

1953 births
Living people
Republican Party members of the Texas House of Representatives
County judges in Texas
People from The Woodlands, Texas
Businesspeople from Texas
American Christian clergy
Protestant religious leaders
American radio personalities
Cedarville University alumni
Dallas Theological Seminary alumni
Grace Theological Seminary alumni
21st-century American politicians